Otitoma jennyae is a species of sea snail, a marine gastropod mollusk in the family Pseudomelatomidae, the turrids and allies.

Description
The length of the shell varies between 8 mm and 12 mm.

Distribution
This marine species occurs off Mactan Island, the Philippines.

References

 Stahlschmidt P., Poppe G.T. & Tagaro S.P. (2018). Descriptions of remarkable new turrid species from the Philippines. Visaya. 5(1): 5-64 page(s): 26, pl. 20 figs 1-3.

External links
 Gastropods.com: Otitoma jennyae

jennyae
Gastropods described in 2018